Hardoi Lok Sabha constituency is one of the 80 Lok Sabha (parliamentary) constituencies in the Indian state of Uttar Pradesh.

Assembly Segments

Members of Parliament

^ by poll

Election results

See also
 Hardoi district
 List of Constituencies of the Lok Sabha

Notes

Lok Sabha constituencies in Uttar Pradesh
Politics of Hardoi district